Podilymbus is a genus of birds in the Grebe family, the genus name is derived from Latin Podilymbus, a contraction of podicipes ("feet at the buttocks", from podici-, "rump-" + pes, "foot")—the origin of the name of the grebe order—and Ancient Greek kolymbos, "diver".

Species
The genus contains two recent species :

There are also several prehistoric taxa of Podilymbus described from fossil remains:
Podilymbus majusculus (Late Pliocene of Idaho)
Podilymbus wetmorei (Late Pleistocene of Florida)
Podilymbus podiceps magnus - a paleosubspecies of the pied-billed grebe of uncertain validity.

References

 
Bird genera
Bird genera with one living species
Extant Late Pleistocene first appearances
Pleistocene birds
Pleistocene birds of North America